James Joseph Hughes (August 15, 1856 – March 5, 1941) was a Canadian politician.

Born in St. Mary's Road, Prince Edward Island, Hughes was the son of Irish parents.  He was educated at the Log School House in St. Mary's Road and was a graduate of St. Dunstan's College in Charlottetown.

A merchant, he was first elected to the House of Commons of Canada for the electoral district of King's in the general elections of 1900. A Liberal, he was re-elected in 1904 but was defeated in 1908. He was elected again in 1911 and was defeated in 1917. He was elected again in 1921. In 1925, he was summoned the Senate of Canada representing the senatorial division of King's, Prince Edward Island on the advice of Prime Minister Mackenzie King. He served until his death in 1941.

His son, William Hughes was a cabinet minister on PEI. His granddaughter, Eileen Rossiter, was also a senator, and another granddaughter Ellen Webber was a controller and alderman in Ottawa.

References

 
 The Canadian Parliament; biographical sketches and photo-engravures of the senators and members of the House of Commons of Canada. Being the tenth Parliament, elected November 3, 1904

1856 births
1941 deaths
People from Kings County, Prince Edward Island
Canadian senators from Prince Edward Island
Liberal Party of Canada MPs
Liberal Party of Canada senators
Members of the House of Commons of Canada from Prince Edward Island